Vachellia schaffneri, the twisted acacia or Schaffner's acacia, is a tree native to Mexico and the United States (Texas).

Description 
This is a thorny tree growing up to 25 feet in height. It has alternate, bipinnately compound leaves that are generally similar to those of other Vachellia species. The plant flowers in spring, with yellow mimosoid flowers. The seedpods are long, fuzzy, ripen in late summer, and are consumed by livestock. They contain many hard, black seeds.

Uses
Vachellia schaffneri wood is used for fuel and fences. The wood makes very good firewood. It is used for cooking.

Vachellia schaffneri trees serve as food for animals. Goats and sheep browse leaves from the tree and eat the fuzzy beans when available late in the summer.  Livestock use the trees for shade and shelter.

Chemical compounds
Some chemical compounds found in Vachellia schaffneri are:
Phenethylamine
Beta-methyl-phenethylamine 
Tyramine     
Hordenine

The foliage and seeds of Vachellia schaffneri have a protein content of about 11.6%.

References

Notes

External links

Xeriscape Landscaping Plants For The Arizona Desert Environment

schaffneri
Forages